María Flora Yáñez Bianchi (September 1898 – 7 April 1982) was a Chilean writer who worked in the novel and short story genres, for which she received the University of Concepción's Atenea Award in 1947 and the Santiago Municipal Literature Award in 1952.

Biography
María Flora Yáñez's father was Eliodoro Yáñez, the Chilean politician and founder of La Nación. Her children were also writers, Alfonso Echevarría (1922–1969) and Mónica Echeverría (1920-2020).

She is included in a group of students assigned to the "Subjectivist School" present not only in Chilean women's literature, but also in the women's contemporary novel.

Some of her texts such as Espejo sin imagen (1936), Icha (1945), Aguas obsuras (1945), Juan Estrella (1954), and Gertrudis (1954) are cataloged as a kind of "autobiographical fiction in the first person". Regarding one of her first publications, El abrazo de la tierra (1933),  includes it within those texts referring to the women's liberation movement, because it treats marriage as synonymous with "mortal boredom", a sacrament that at the beginning of the 20th century was associated with the conservative ideology of Chilean society.

Yáñez also wrote for several magazines and newspapers, including El Mercurio, and Atenea.

Works
 El abrazo de la tierra (1933)
 Mundo en sombra (1935)
 Espejo sin imagen (novel, 1936)
 Visiones de infancia (1947)
 Las cenizas (novel, 1949)
 La piedra (novel, 1952)
 El estanque (short stories, Ediciones La Semana Literaria, 1945 and 1954)
 Visiones de infancia (1960)
 ¿Dónde está el trigo y el vino? (1962)
 Otra comarca (1963)
 El último faro (1967)
 Juan Estrella (1970)
 El peldaño (1974)
 Historia de mi vida: fragmentos (Nascimento, 1980)

References

External links
 Historia de mi vida at Memoria Chilena

1898 births
1982 deaths
20th-century Chilean women writers
20th-century Chilean short story writers
Chilean women short story writers
Chilean women novelists
20th-century Chilean novelists